Knute Haugsjaa (1915-1959) was an American architect who designed many buildings in the state of Montana.

Life and career
Knute Haugsjaa was born December 29, 1915, in Pekin, North Dakota. He was educated in the local schools and at the North Dakota Agricultural College, graduating in 1939. Haugsjaa then joined the office of Great Falls architect Angus V. McIver, one of the leading architects in the state. In 1941 he went to work for the McNeil Construction Company of Los Angeles and Las Vegas, and in 1943 joined Boeing in Seattle as a factory and hangar designer. Concurrent with his time with Boeing he served in the United States Coast Guard Reserve. In 1945 Haugsjaa returned to Montana, rejoining McIver as chief designer. In 1950 McIver formed a partnership with Haugsjaa and his chief draftsman, William J. Hess, to form the firm of A. V. McIver & Associates, which became McIver, Hess & Haugsjaa in 1953. This firm lasted until Haugsjaa's death, which occurred on March 20, 1959.

References

1915 births
1959 deaths
People from Nelson County, North Dakota
People from Great Falls, Montana
Architects from Montana
20th-century American architects